The fossil taxon Priapulites is the earliest-known crown-group priapulid, and is closely related to the Priapulidae.

References 

Priapulida
Prehistoric protostome genera
†Priapulites